Dr. Holger H. Herwig (born 1941) is a German-born Canadian historian and professor. He is the author of more than a dozen books, including the award-winning, The First World War: Germany and Austria-Hungary 1914-1918 and The Origins of World War I, written with Richard F. Hamilton. His research focuses on World War I and German military and political history. Dr. Herwig holds a dual position at the University of Calgary as Professor of History and as Canada Research Chair in the Centre for Military and Strategic Studies.

Early life and education
Herwig was born on September 25, 1941 in Hamburg, Germany.

In 1965, he earned his Bachelor of Arts degree from the University of British Columbia; in 1967, he obtained his Master's degree from the State University of New York at Stony Brook. In 1971, he received a Ph.D from Stony Brook.

Career
From 1971 to 1989, Herwig taught at Vanderbilt University in Nashville, Tennessee. For one year, starting in 1985, he was  visiting Professor of Strategy at the Naval War College in Newport, Rhode Island.

In 1991, he was made Head of the Department of History at the University of Calgary. He held this position until 1996.  Herwig was the Andrea and Charles Bronfman Distinguished Visiting Professor of Judaic Studies at the College of William & Mary in Virginia in 1998.

He is a Fellow of the Royal Society of Canada.

Herwig has written and co-authored over a dozen books. Many of his books have been translated into Chinese, Czech, German, Polish, Portuguese, Serbs-Croatian, and Spanish. His research interests include German imperial history, German military history, German political and diplomatic history, and strategic studies. Military Diplomatic History and Europe fall under his areas of specialization.

With co-author, David Bercuson, Herwig wrote Deadly Seas: The Destruction of the Bismarck and One Christmas in Washington. The former book captured the attention of filmmaker James Cameron. Both Bercuson and Herwig produced Cameron's film for the Discovery Channel, James Cameron's Expedition: Bismarck. Herwig's other television projects in collaboration with Bercuson include Deadly Seas (1998), Murder in Normandy (1999), and Forced March to Freedom (2001).

Publications
The Demon of Geopolitics: How Karl Haushofer "Educated" Hitler and Hess (2016).
Long Night of the Tankers: Hitler's War Against Caribbean Oil (2012), co-author with David J. Bercuson,  
The Marne, 1914: The Opening of World War I and the Battle that Changed the World (2011),   
 German: Marne 1914: eine Schlacht, die die Welt veränderte? Verlag Ferdinand Schöningh, 2016, . 
War Memory and Popular Culture: Essays on Modes of Remembrance and Commemoration (2009), 
War Planning 1914 (2009), co-author with Richard F. Hamilton, 
World History of Warfare (2008), co-author with Christon Archer, John Ferris, and Tim Travers,  
One Christmas in Washington: The Secret Meeting Between Roosevelt and Churchill that Changed the World (2006), co-author with David J. Bercuson  
One Christmas in Washington: Roosevelt and Churchill Forge the Grand Alliance (2005), co-author with David J. Bercuson and Lloyd James, 
Decisions for War, 1914-1917 (2004), co-author with Richard F. Hamilton, 
The Origins of World War I (2003), co-author with Richard F. Hamilton, 
Cassell's World History of Warfare: The Global History of Warfare from Ancient Times to the Present Day (2003),  
The Destruction of the Bismarck (2001), co-author with David J. Bercuson,  
The Grand Illusion: The Prussianization of the Chilean Army (Studies in War, Society, and the Militar) (1999), co-author with William F. Sater Ph.D. MA AB,  
The Nazi Revolution (1999) co-author with Alan Mitchell and Theodore S. Hamerow,   
Deadly Seas: The Duel Between the St. Croix and the U305 in the Battle of the Atlantic (1998), 
The First World War: Germany and Austria-Hungary 1914-1918 (1997),  
The Outbreak of World War I (Problems in European Civilization Series (1996)  
Hammer or Anvil? Modern Germany 1648-Present (Problems in European Civilization Series) (1993)  
The Outbreak of World War I: Causes and Responsibilities (Problems in European Civilization Series) (1990) The Naval Strategy of the World War (Classics of Sea Power) (1989)  (Translator) with Vice Admiral Wolfgang Wegener (Author), Luxury Fleet: The Imperial Germany Navy, 1888-1918 (1987),  Germany's Vision of Empire in Venezuela, 1871-1914 (1986),  Biographical Dictionary of World War I (1982), co-author with Neil M. Heyman Politics of Frustration: The United States in German Naval Planning, 1889-1941 (1976)  German Naval Officer Corps'' (1973)

References

External links

i2eye with Dr. Holger Herwig

1941 births
Living people
American military historians
American male non-fiction writers
University of British Columbia alumni
Stony Brook University alumni
Vanderbilt University faculty